Richard Lewis Wesson (November 19, 1922 – April 25, 1996) was a prolific character actor, comedian, comedy writer, and producer.

Biography
Dick Wesson was born on November 19, 1922 in Boston, Massachusetts. A comedian, impressionist and singer, Wesson appeared with his brother Gene in a comedy act appropriately called "The Wesson Brothers".  They had some hit records such as "Oodles of Boodle" and "All Right Louie, Drop the Gun". Wesson married Wini Walsh and they had one child together, daughter Eileen Wesson (b. 1947). 

In 1949, Wesson became a television series regular with Jim Backus in Hollywood House. Making his film debut in Destination Moon (1950), Wesson signed a contract as a supporting actor with Warner Bros., leaving that studio in 1953. His films for Warner's included Burning Arrow, Calamity Jane (1953), and Desert Song. Wesson played comedy relief in all his films, frequently as a World War II soldier in Breakthrough (1950) and Force of Arms (1951), and in the Old West with The Man Behind the Gun (1952) and The Charge at Feather River (1953). Wesson's best known role was as Francis Fryer in Calamity Jane (1953).

Wesson moved to television appearing as Jackie Cooper's ex-United States Marine Corps sidekick, Rollo, on NBC's The People's Choice and as Frank Crenshaw in The Bob Cummings Show.  Wesson began writing for The Bob Cummings Show and later The Beverly Hillbillies. He appeared in The Beverly Hillbillies as a taxi driver and as a patient in The Beverly Hillbillies season 1, episode 33 The Clampetts Get Psychoanalyzed.  He produced CBS's My Sister Eileen and many episodes of Petticoat Junction and directed several episodes of each series. He portrayed Jack Reardon on the 1974 CBS situation comedy Paul Sand in Friends and Lovers. 

Wesson later died of an aneurysm on April 25, 1996 in Rancho Mirage, California.

Filmography

Notes

External links
 
 Great character actors http://www.playbrass.com/kingspud/sel_by_actor_index_2.php?actor_first=Dick&actor_last=Wesson
 Wesson with Sammy Davis Jr. on Hollywood House https://www.youtube.com/watch?v=rbpcY0svdvU

1922 births
1996 deaths
American male comedians
American television directors
American male television actors
American male film actors
American television writers
American male television writers
Male actors from Boston
Male actors from Los Angeles
20th-century American male actors
Comedians from California
Screenwriters from Massachusetts
Screenwriters from California
20th-century American comedians
20th-century American screenwriters
20th-century American male writers
Deaths from aneurysm